The 1953 Oklahoma A&M Cowboys football team represented Oklahoma Agricultural and Mechanical College (later renamed Oklahoma State University–Stillwater) in the Missouri Valley Conference during the 1953 college football season. In their fourth season under head coach Jennings B. Whitworth, the Cowboys compiled a 7–3 record (3–1 against conference opponents), tied with Detroit for the Missouri Valley championship, and outscored opponents by a combined total of 178 to 149.

On offense, the 1953 team averaged 17.8 points scored, 226.5 rushing yards, and 47.9 passing yards per game.  On defense, the team allowed an average of 14.9 points scored, 164.8 rushing yards and 78.4 passing yards per game. The team's statistical leaders included Earl Lunsford with 748 rushing yards, Bobby Green with 219 passing yards, and Bob LaRue with 122 receiving yards.

Four Oklahoma A&M players received first-team All-Missouri Valley Conference honors: end Bob LaRue, tackle Dale Meinert, and backs Bill Bredde, and Earl Lunsford.

The team played its home games at Lewis Field in Stillwater, Oklahoma.

Schedule

After the season

The 1954 NFL Draft was held on January 28, 1954. The following Cowboys were selected.

References

Oklahoma AandM
Oklahoma State Cowboys football seasons
Missouri Valley Conference football champion seasons
Oklahoma AM Cowboys football